Maximiliano Andres Laso  (born 17 February 1988 in Buenos Aires) or simply known as Maxi Laso, is an Argentine footballer who plays for Club Atlético San Telmo.

References
 De Pergamino a Adrogué, soloascenso.com.ar, 7 January 2016

External links
 
 

1988 births
Living people
Footballers from Buenos Aires
Argentine footballers
Argentine Primera División players
Primera B Metropolitana players
Primera Nacional players
Cypriot First Division players
Liga II players
Liga Portugal 2 players
Club Atlético Banfield footballers
Grêmio Barueri Futebol players
Unión de Santa Fe footballers
AEL Limassol players
FC UTA Arad players
FC Olimpia Satu Mare players
ASA 2013 Târgu Mureș players
S.C. Freamunde players
Talleres de Remedios de Escalada footballers
San Telmo footballers
Argentine expatriate footballers
Expatriate footballers in Brazil
Expatriate footballers in Cyprus
Expatriate footballers in Portugal
Expatriate footballers in Romania
Argentine expatriate sportspeople in Brazil
Argentine expatriate sportspeople in Cyprus
Argentine expatriate sportspeople in Portugal
Argentine expatriate sportspeople in Romania
Association football midfielders